Nectandra fulva is a species of plant in the family Lauraceae. It is endemic to Venezuela.

References

fulva
Endemic flora of Venezuela
Vulnerable flora of South America
Taxonomy articles created by Polbot